Shaposhnik is a Russian-language occupational surname, literally meaning hatter,. Variants include Shaposhnyk (Ukrainian), Shapotshnick, Shapochnik, etc. Notable people with the surname include:

Rabbi Joseph Shapotshnick (1882–1937), Jewish social activist in Great Britain
Oleksandr Shaposhnyk (born 1983), Ukrainian Olympic  taekwondo practitioner
 (1902—1985), Soviet automotive designer
 (1934-2009), Ukrainian writer and Cossack activist

See also
Shaposhnikov (surname)

References

Russian-language surnames
Ukrainian-language surnames
Occupational surnames